Kaigram High School is a secondary school in the village of Kaigram, West Bengal, India.

References 

High schools and secondary schools in West Bengal
Schools in Purba Bardhaman district
Educational institutions in India with year of establishment missing